Robert Sandford may refer to:

Robert Sandford (died 1459/1460) for Appleby in 1413 and a Baron of the Exchequer 1417-1418
Robert Sandford (died 1403/1404), MP for Westmorland 1388
Robert Sandford (1692–1777), MP for Boyle and Newcastle (Parliament of Ireland constituency)
Robert Sandford (1722–1793), MP for Athy and Roscommon Borough (Parliament of Ireland constituency)
Robert Sandford (explorer) (fl.18thC), explorer of the Province of Carolina and early colonist of Surinam